Alagomyidae is a family of rodents known from the late Paleocene and early Eocene of Asia and North America (McKenna and Bell, 1997). Alagomyids have been identified as the most basal rodents, lying outside the common ancestry of living forms (Meng et al., 1994). Because of their phylogenetic position and their conservative dental morphology, alagomyids have played a key role in investigations of the origins and relationships of rodents (Meng et al., 1994; Meng and Wyss, 2001).

References 
McKenna, Malcolm C., and Bell, Susan K. 1997. Classification of Mammals Above the Species Level. Columbia University Press, New York, 631 pp. 
Meng, J., A.R. Wyss, M.R. Dawson, and R. Zhai, 1994. Primitive fossil rodent from Inner Mongolia and its implications for mammalian phylogeny Nature 370:134-136.
Meng, J., and A.R. Wyss, 2001. The morphology of Tribosphenomys (Rodentiaformes, Mammalia): phylogenetic implications for basal Glires Journal of Mammalian Evolution 8(1):1-71.

Paleocene rodents
Eocene rodents
Paleocene first appearances
Eocene extinctions